Samuel Adams is the flagship brand of the Boston Beer Company. The brand name (often shortened to Sam Adams) was chosen in honor of Founding Father of the United States Samuel Adams. Adams inherited his father's brewery on King Street (modern day State Street). Some historians say he was a brewer, while others describe him as a maltster. The Samuel Adams brewery is located in Boston, Massachusetts, United States, where visitors can take a tour, and shop beers and merchandise. Samuel Adams beer is brewed by the Boston Beer Company, which was founded by Jim Koch in Cambridge, MA, where he started the micro-brewery in his home. Koch comes from a long line of Cincinnati brewers, and Samuel Adams beer was started using a recipe now known as the Samuel Adams Boston Lager.

Beers

Year-round

Seasonal

Utopias
In 2002, the company released Utopias. At 24% abv, it was marketed as the strongest commercial beer in the world (a mark that has since been challenged). The company subsequently released new "vintages" of Utopias annually, increasing the alcoholic content to 27% abv by 2007, and increasing further to 28% abv in 2019.

Utopias is made with caramel, Vienna, Moravian and Bavarian smoked malts, and four varieties of noble hops: Hallertauer Mittelfrüh, Tettnanger, Spalter, and Saaz hops. The beer is matured in scotch, cognac and port barrels for almost a year. A limited number of bottles are released each year; in 2007, only 12,000 bottles were produced, and in 2009, only 9,000 bottles were released. Sold in a ceramic bottle resembling a copper-finished brewing kettle, a single bottle of Utopias cost $100 in 2002, $150 in 2009, $200 in 2017, and $210 in 2019.

Because of legal restrictions, Utopias is not offered in the states of Alabama, Arkansas, Georgia, Idaho, Missouri, Mississippi, Montana, New Hampshire, North Carolina, Oklahoma, Oregon, South Carolina, Utah, Vermont, or West Virginia.

Official beer of the Red Sox
Beginning with the 2018 season, Samuel Adams became the official beer of the Boston Red Sox replacing Budweiser. The eight-year deal will last through the 2025 season and include signage at Fenway Park. The agreement also allows Boston Beer to use the Red Sox logo for marketing purposes, as well as to conduct Red Sox related contests with tickets to games.

As of 2020, Samuel Adams's Fenway Faithful IPA, a session IPA, is the official beer of the Boston Red Sox.

Brewery
The Boston Brewery opened in 1987 and it is where every beer was first made, aside from the Boston Lager. There are two other breweries, located in Cincinnati, Ohio and Lehigh Valley, Pennsylvania. The Boston Brewery is open for public tours and tastings.

Media 
Samuel Adams beer has gained attention in the media for its various beers. In a list of "Best Christmas/Winter Beer in Each State", Samuel Adams' Fezziwig brew won in the state of Massachusetts. Additionally, Samuel Adams brewery itself was named the best brewery in all of Massachusetts according to a Yelp-based Buzzed article.</p>
In the 2015 musical Hamilton, in the song "Aaron Burr, Sir," John Laurens sings "I'm John Laurens in the place to be, two pints of Sam Adams, but I'm workin' on three".

References

External links
 

American beer brands